St. Xavier's College, Maitighar is a private, Jesuit, co-educational secondary and tertiary educational institution run by the Nepal Region of the Society of Jesus in Kathmandu, Nepal. It was founded by the Jesuits in 1988 AD. Since its very inception the College has been offering quality education and has contributed to the development of the nation through the production of highly qualified human resources. 

St. Xavier's College is managed by the Nepal Jesuit Society. Jesuits began their educational work in Nepal in 1951 with the opening of St. Xavier's School, the Godavari, followed by St. Xavier's School, Jawalakhel and St. Xavier's School, Deonia. Other schools run by Nepal Jesuit Society are Moran Memorial School, Maheshpur and St.Xavier's, Sadakbari.

Currently, St Xavier's College offers 13 different programs. It runs A-level Non-Science and Science under Cambridge Assessment International Education and Ten Plus Two (10+2) program in Science under the affiliation of National Examination Board (NEB). In Bachelor level with affiliation from Tribhuvan University, St Xavier's College offers B.Sc Physics, B.Sc Microbiology, B.Sc. CSIT, Bachelor of Information Management (BIM), Bachelor of Arts (Majoring in Social Work and English) and Bachelor of Business Studies (BBS) program. It also runs the Bachelor's of Social Work (BSW) program with affiliation from Kathmandu University. It also offers Masters programs in Microbiology (M.Sc Microbiology), Physics (M.Sc Physics) and Masters in Business Studies (MBS) under Tribhuvan University.

History
Jesuits began their educational work in Nepal in 1951. St. Xavier's College functioned as an evening Intermediate Science class from the premises of St. Xavier's School, Jawalakhel in the initial years, and later moved to its own building at Maitighar, Kathmandu, in 1993. For the first eight years, the only course offered was Intermediate in Science, in affiliation with Tribhuvan University. In 1996 the three-year Bachelor of Science in Social Work, the first of its kind in Nepal, was established in conjunction with Kathmandu University. In 1997 a B.Sc. in Environmental Science was offered but after three years discontinued admitting students. Since then bachelor's degrees have been added in Business Studies and Physics in 2002, in Information Management in 2003, and in 2007 in Computer Science and Information Technology, Microbiology, and B.A. in English, Journalism and Social Work. In 2007 also five master's degree programs were established, in Physics, Microbiology, Business, Social Work, and English. 10+2 was initiated in 2009 and GCE Advanced Level was initiated in 2011.

The college moved to Maitighar Heights in 1988 and the first new building, the Academic Block, was built in 1993. The construction of the Administration Block was completed in 1998, followed by that of Watrin Hall and the Library Block in 2000. To cater to the needs of the two IT-based degree programs, and to provide all students with computer facilities, four computer laboratories were constructed, with a total of 203 internet-connected computers. The E.L. Watrin Memorial Building was built in 2005, linking the Academic Block with the Administration Block. A rooftop cafeteria was built in 2006. In 2009 a six-storey building housing modern laboratories for physics, chemistry, botany, zoology, and microbiology and social studies. There is also a sports hall that doubles as an auditorium. The college celebrated its silver jubilee in 2013.

Today, the college has approximately 3,000 students coming from 275 schools representing all 77 districts and almost all the ethnic, linguistic, and cultural diversity of Nepal. One of the innovative outreach programs is the Partnership in Education (PIE) established in 2004. PIE works in partnership with government schools for the development of the academically weak students in the lowest income brackets, accommodating approximately 300 students annually.

Admission
Admission to St. Xavier's College is extremely competitive, especially in the 10+2 program. Each year more than 13,000 students from all across Nepal apply and 504 students are enrolled for the +2 program (entailing an average acceptance rate of 3.8%). The admissions process includes a preliminary cutoff score at the SEE, an analytic multiple choice examination, and an interview with college personnel.

Other departments of the college have a similar admission procedure.

Academic programs

Intermediate Level Courses

Plus Two (+2)
In 2009, Higher Secondary Level (+2) science stream was initiated in affiliation with the Higher Secondary Education Board, NEB (National Examination Board), Nepal. This level of education is the main reason for this college to acclaim its reputation in the country. The college has completed its sixth year of the +2 program. The Higher Secondary Level (+2) science program has offered only two sub-streams: Biology and Physics.

Subjects offered for the Biology sub-stream are Biology, Chemistry, English, Extra Math, Mathematics, Nepali and Physics. Meanwhile, Biology, Chemistry, English, Mathematics, Nepali and Physics are offered for the Physics sub-stream. This is the only college in Nepal who let even the students of +2 to attend college in casual wear.

GCE Advanced Level 
The GCE Advanced Level program started at St. Xavier's College from 2011 A.D. which is affiliated with Cambridge Assessment International Education. In 2017, it became an Independent Center (i.e. a Cambridge International School).

The offered courses are Accounting, Biology, Business, Chemistry, Computer Science, Economics, English General Paper, Mathematics, Physics, Further Mathematics, Psychology and Sociology.

The college has a Society established by the students named St. Xavier's A-Level Society (SAS) which mobilizes the students for independent course work and a collaborative teamwork in addition to leadership.

Undergraduate and Postgraduate Courses 
As of 2021, there are 7 undergraduate and 3 graduate level courses. The undergraduate courses are Bachelor in Business Studies (BBS), Bachelor in Major Arts (BA), Bachelor in Information Management (BIM), Bachelor of Science in Computer Science and Information Technology (B.Sc. CSIT), Bachelor of Science in Physics, Bachelor of Science in Microbiology which are affiliated under Tribhuvan University. Bachelor in Social Work (BSW) runs under the affiliation of Kathmandu University.

The graduate courses are Master in Business Studies (MBS), Master of Science in Physics, Master of Science in Microbiology which are affiliated under Tribhuvan University.

Clubs 
The college encourages its students in undergraduate and graduate level to engage in activities through the establishment of various clubs: UDAAN, Social Service Club, St. Xavier's Solidarity Movement, Sports Club, ECO Club, Physics Club, Chemistry Club, Social Service Environment Club (SET), Art and culture club, Literature club, SXC Collabrains, SEDS-SXC.

List of Principals
  
 Dr. Shriram Bhagut Mathe (1988-1992)
 Fr. Charles Law, S.J. (1992-1993)
 Fr. Francis Vazhappilly, S.J. (1993-1998)
 Fr. T.M. Joseph, S.J. (1998-2001)
 
 Fr. P.T. Augustine, S.J. (2001-2007)
 Fr. Dr. A. Antonysamy, S.J. (2007-2012)
 Fr. Dr. Augustine Thomas, S.J. (2012-2016)
 Fr. Jiju Varghese, S.J. (2016–2020)
 Fr. Dr. Augustine Thomas, S.J. (2020–Present)

Alumni
In 2013, the school's 25th anniversary year, the college set up its Alumni Association. The Alumni Committee looks after and handles all the alumni activities as the St. Xavier's College, Kathmandu - Alumni.
 (2016)
 Hikes: Chandragiri (2016), Pilotbaba Ashram (2015), Phulchoki (2014), Champadevi (2013)
 Strings for Smiles (2016, 2014) [in association with FocusEd Nepal]
 Ride Against Cancer (2020, 2019, 2018, 2017, 2016, 2015) [in association with Richa Bajimaya Memorial Foundation]
 Changa Chet (2013), नवक्षितिज: आशाका किरण (2015) [in association with USM club]
 Alumni of SXC, a group in Facebook intended to unite all alumni in one place (2015)
 SXC Alumni Day, a yearly event to gather alumni under the same place held on 25 December (2020, 2019, 2018, 2017, 2016, 2015, 2014, 2014 June)
 Career Counselling: International Studies in the United States (2014)

 Initiatives 

 Alumni Satellite Group:''' Alumni groups around the country and the world.

See also
 St. Xavier's School, Jawalakhel    
 St. Xavier's School, Godavari
 List of Jesuit sites

References

External links 
 Official Website
 Official Alumni Website
 Videos

Jesuit schools in Nepal
Universities and colleges in Nepal
Jesuit universities and colleges
Catholic universities and colleges in Asia
Educational institutions established in 1988
1988 establishments in Nepal
Schools in Kathmandu